Sloviansk Raion was a raion of  Donetsk Oblast, located in southeastern Ukraine. The administrative center of the district was the city of Sloviansk, which was separately incorporated as a city of oblast significance and did not belong to the raion. The raion was abolished on 18 July 2020 as part of the administrative reform of Ukraine, which reduced the number of raions of Donetsk Oblast to eight, of which only five were controlled by the government.

Demographics
According to the 2001 Ukrainian Census:

2014 fighting

On 2 May 2014, armed clashes were reported in and around Sloviansk with reported casualties, including killed and wounded, and downed helicopters.

References

Former raions of Donetsk Oblast
1923 establishments in Ukraine
Ukrainian raions abolished during the 2020 administrative reform